Wheeler Valley is the ice-free hanging valley on the southwest side of Miller Glacier, immediately east of Mount Mahony in Victoria Land. Named by the Victoria University of Wellington Antarctic Expedition (VUWAE) (1959–60) for R.H. Wheeler, the party's deputy leader and surveyor.

Valleys of Victoria Land
McMurdo Dry Valleys